A by-election was held for the New South Wales Legislative Assembly electorate of Liverpool Plains on 7 April 1863 because of the resignation of Alexander Dick, to accept appointment as 
2nd examiner of titles under the Real Property Act.

Dates

Polling places

Polling was delayed at Carroll and Grover's Inn because the Namoi River was in flood, with polling taking place on 11 February.

Result

The by-election was caused by the resignation of Alexander Dick.

See also
Electoral results for the district of Liverpool Plains
List of New South Wales state by-elections

Notes

References

1863 elections in Australia
New South Wales state by-elections
1860s in New South Wales